Karol Beck (born 3 April 1982) is a male former tennis player from Slovakia, who turned professional in 2001. His career-high singles ranking is World No. 36, achieved in August 2005. Beck reached the fourth round of the 2004 US Open and the quarterfinals of the 2005 Montreal Masters, defeating Nikolay Davydenko en route to both runs.

Career 
On 25 October 2004, Beck lost in the final of the St. Petersburg Open to Mikhail Youzhny 6–2, 6–2.

On 13 February 2006 the International Tennis Federation (ITF) announced Beck had tested positive for the beta agonist clenbuterol during the 2005 Davis Cup semifinal for Slovakia against Argentina, which Slovakia won 4–1. As a consequence, the ITF suspended him from the game for two years until 31 October 2007.

2007 
Beck finished serving his suspension and began playing again in November as an unranked player. He had to go through qualifying rounds in every tournament.

Without a ranking, he chose the Tunis challenger as his first tournament to qualify in. He qualified and won his first round match to get his first ranking points. The next week, he had a wild card entry into qualifying for the Dnepropetrovsk challenger, and qualified to pick up some more points.

He qualified a couple more times at challengers and futures tournaments before winning his final tournament of 2007, the Czech F6 Futures, to finish up the year at No. 581, after playing in just 5 tournaments.

2008 
He began 2008 from where he left off in 2007, qualifying into and winning his first tournament, Germany's F1 Futures, to get into the top-500.

2009 
Beck took part in the 2009 Wimbledon Championships ranked as 143rd in the world. He was a lucky loser due to the withdrawal of then-World No. 1, Rafael Nadal. He was drawn against 21st seed Feliciano López in the first round and won a thrilling five set encounter 1–6, 7–5, 6–3, 4–6, 10–8 to reach the second round of a grand slam tournament for the first time since the 2005 Australian Open. In the second round, he would meet another Spaniard, this being Nicolás Almagro. He played another 5-setter, but, this time, he lost 4–6, 6–7, 6–3, 6–3, 5–7.

ATP career finals

Singles: 1 (0–1)

Doubles: 2 (0–2)

Challenger and Futures Finals

Singles: 32 (17–15)

Doubles: 43 (27–16)

Performance timelines

Singles

Doubles

See also
 List of sportspeople sanctioned for doping offences

External links

 
 
 
 Beck World Ranking History
 
 
 

1982 births
Living people
Doping cases in tennis
Olympic tennis players of Slovakia
Tennis players at the 2004 Summer Olympics
Slovak sportspeople in doping cases
Slovak male tennis players
Sportspeople from Zvolen